Thozhur Krishnan Nair (May 22 1896 – June 15 1972) was the second and the last Prime Minister of the state of Cochin, India, beginning in 1947.

References

1896 births
1972 deaths
Politicians from Thrissur
Malayali politicians
Indian independence activists from Kerala
Chief Ministers of Kerala